War & Peace is an album recorded by Edwin Starr and released by Motown Records in 1970. The album reached number 52 on the Billboard 200 and #9 on the R&B album chart, while the single, "War" reached #1 on the Billboard Hot 100 chart, where it remained for 15 weeks. The song was nominated for best R&B Male Vocal Performance at the 13th Annual Grammy Awards in 1971. The album's arrangements are by David Van De Pitte, Henry Cosby, Paul Riser, Wade Marcus and Willie Shorter. The art direction and design by Curtis McNair.

Track listing

References

External links 
 Roberts, David (2006). British Hit Singles & Albums (19th ed.), London: Guinness World Records Limited, page 524. 
 
 
 Edwin Starr, "War" - Superseventies.com
 Edwin Starr interview by Pete Lewis, 'Blues & Soul' 10/92

1970 albums
Gordy Records albums
Motown albums
Albums arranged by Paul Riser
Albums arranged by Wade Marcus